Giorgio Cristallini (1921–1999) was an Italian screenwriter and film director.

Selected filmography
 Operation Mitra (1951)
 Legions of the Nile (1959)
 Samson and His Mighty Challenge (1964)
 La bambola di Satana (1969)
 Seagulls Fly Low (1978)

References

Bibliography 
 Roberto Curti. Italian Gothic Horror Films, 1957-1969. McFarland, 2015.

External links 
 

1921 births
1999 deaths
Italian film directors
20th-century Italian screenwriters
People from Perugia
Italian male screenwriters
20th-century Italian male writers